Château-Landon is a station on line 7 of the Paris Métro in the 10th arrondissement.

History
The station was opened on 5 November 1910 as part of the first section of the line from Opéra to Porte de la Villette. It is named after the Rue Château-Landon, a street which was built on property once owned by a family from Château-Landon in Seine-et-Marne.  The street is on the alignment of the Roman road from Lutetia towards the North via Saint-Denis.

It was planned to become the end of the future new line (created from the merger of line 3bis and line 7bis). It is also planned to build an underground pedestrian connection to the RER Line E station of Magenta, which would also link to the Gare du Nord and the Gare de l'Est.

Passenger services

Access
Apart from the direct access from the platforms of the Gare de l'Est station, the station has only one access in front of 188 Rue du Faubourg-Saint-Martin. A second access (exit only, by escalator), was located a few meters south of the current entrance, was condemned in the early 1990s.

Station layout

Platforms
Château-Landon has two platforms separated by the two metro tracks, themselves separated by a wall forming two half-stations each with an elliptical vault. The decoration is in the Ouï-dire style of red. The lighting canopy, of the same colour, is supported by curved hangers in the shape of a scythe. The direct lighting is white while the indirect lighting, projected on the vault, is multicoloured. The white ceramic tiles are flat and cover the walls, vault, tunnel exits and outlets of the corridors. The advertising frames are red and cylindrical and the name of the station is written with the Parisine font on enamelled plates. The platforms are equipped with red Motte style seats.

Gallery

References
Roland, Gérard (2003). Stations de métro. D’Abbesses à Wagram. Éditions Bonneton.

Paris Métro stations in the 10th arrondissement of Paris
Railway stations in France opened in 1910